Fashion District Philadelphia is a shopping mall in Philadelphia, Pennsylvania, United States, located in Center City along Market Street. It opened in 2019 on the site of a previous mall known as The Gallery and later renamed The Gallery at Market East. 

The mall was envisioned to fill that "void" that even smaller cities have, to sell items to the Center City market that had previously only been available elsewhere.  The Fashion District Philadelphia currently has Burlington, Primark, AMC Theatres, and Round One Entertainment as anchors.

History

Prior to the Fashion District Philadelphia, the space originally opened in 1977 as The Gallery. It was later expanded with the construction of The Gallery II in the early 1980s. The Pennsylvania Real Estate Investment Trust (PREIT) acquired The Gallery in April 2003 from The Rouse Company and Gallery II in the third fiscal quarter of 2004 from the state's Public School Employees' Retirement System.

The space was originally anchored by Strawbridge & Clothier department store at 8th Street and Gimbels department store at 9th Street. 

It later became part of the entrance to access SEPTA's Regional Rail Lines with the opening of the Market East Station, later rebranded for Jefferson University as Jefferson Station. The mall also provided access to the underground Concourse that connects to the Market-Frankford Line, PATCO Speedline to New Jersey, Broad Street Subway Line, the SEPTA subway–surface trolley lines, and others.

In September 2008, the developers of Foxwoods Casino Philadelphia changed their proposed casino location to The Gallery at Market East after receiving opposition from residents near the original proposed site in South Philadelphia. The new proposal was endorsed by both Mayor Michael Nutter and Governor Ed Rendell. The original proposal for the Foxwoods Casino at The Gallery at Market East was for a 3,000-slot-machine casino on two floors that were occupied by Burlington Department Store (formerly Burlington Coat Factory) which would have necessitated moving the store. However, on February 26, 2009, it was announced that the developers had instead decided to locate their new casino on three floors of the former Strawbridge's building.

In January 2014, it was announced that Kmart would be closing its Gallery store in late April. At the time, it was announced that there were plans to turn the former Kmart space into multiple street-facing stores centered on an atrium, and to redevelop the mostly vacant top level of the mall in other ways. In April 2014 Century 21 Clothing announced that it would open an anchor store at the mall, which has since closed. In July 2014, Macerich acquired a 50% stake in The Gallery at Market East and invested $106.8 million to redevelop the mall as part of a joint venture partnership with PREIT.

As of June 19, 2015, the $325 million remodeling of "The Gallery" had been officially approved by the city council, and the legislation had been approved by Philadelphia Mayor Michael Nutter. Demolition started in August 2015, with construction expected to last two years and a grand opening sometime in 2017. According to the website for the Fashions Outlets of Philadelphia, the Burlington and Century 21 anchor stores would remain open during reconstruction.

In August 2017, the developers announced that outlets plan has been abandoned and the mall would instead feature a mix of retail, entertainment, and dining venues, much to that of a traditional shopping mall. The mall would effectively be renamed Fashion District Philadelphia. It was initially slated to reopen in the spring of 2018. However, the decision to move Burlington and add an AMC Theatres multiplex led PREIT to delay opening most of the revamped complex until 2019. 

The grand opening for Fashion District Philadelphia took place on September 19, 2019, with a ribbon-cutting ceremony held. The AMC Dine-In Fashion District 8 dine-in movie theater opened on November 4, 2019. The opening of this movie theater marked the first time since 2002 that Center City Philadelphia had a multi-screen movie theater; Philadelphia had previously been the only major city in the United States without a multi-screen movie theater in the downtown area. On December 21, 2019, a Round One Entertainment bowling and entertainment center opened at Fashion District Philadelphia.

In October 2019, it was announced that Primark would open a  store at Fashion District Philadelphia at the corner of 11th and Market streets. The store opened on September 16, 2021. Century 21 closed in 2020 as a result of the chain filing for bankruptcy and closing all stores.

After PREIT filed for bankruptcy in 2020, PREIT relinquished its primary control of Fashion District Philadelphia on January 1, 2021, with Macerich taking over management of the mall. Macerich made a $100 million payment on a $301 million loan backed by Fashion District Philadelphia.

On December 16, 2021, a Giant Heirloom Market grocery store opened in the ground level of the former Strawbridge's department store at 8th Street.

On July 21, 2022, the Philadelphia 76ers, the city's NBA franchise, announced its plans to build a new arena, 76 Place at Market East, on part of the site, costing at least $1.3 Billion.

Transit connections

The following rail stations are connected to Fashion District Philadelphia
8th St Station — SEPTA Market–Frankford Line, SEPTA Broad–Ridge Spur, PATCO Speedline
11th St Station — SEPTA Market–Frankford Line
Jefferson Station — SEPTA Regional Rail

Besides the SEPTA rail connections, various SEPTA city bus routes and NJ Transit bus routes have stops next to Fashion District Philadelphia. The Philadelphia Greyhound Terminal, Philadelphia's primary intercity bus station, is located immediately to the north of Fashion District Philadelphia.

Anchors 
Burlington  
Primark   
AMC Dine-In Fashion District 8
Round One Entertainment
GIANT Heirloom Market

Former anchors 
Strawbridge's
Gimbels (1977-1986)
Kmart (closed 2014)
Century 21 (closed 2020)

References

External links

fashiondistrictphiladelphia.com - website for Fashion District Philadelphia
 - 40 photos that show off Philly’s colorful new Fashion District

Buildings and structures in Philadelphia
Shopping malls in Pennsylvania
Shopping malls established in 1977
Economy of Philadelphia
Pennsylvania Real Estate Investment Trust
Macerich
Market East, Philadelphia